The Diocese of Funen (Danish: Fyens Stift) is a diocese within the Evangelical Lutheran Church of Denmark. St. Canute's Cathedral in Odense serves as the seat of its bishop. Tine Lindhardt has been the bishop of the diocese since 2012.

History 

The Roman Catholic bishopric of Odense was established some time before 988. During the Reformation in 1536, the Catholic diocese dissolved and was replaced by the current Lutheran Diocese of Funen. The newly established diocese's first bishop was Jørgen Sadolin, a Protestant reformer who had preached in Odense before the Reformation.

In 1803, the region of Lolland-Falster split off from the diocese to form the Diocese of Lolland-Falster. The islands of Als and Ærø similarly split off in 1819 to form their own diocese, though this diocese was eventually dissolved. Æro came back under Funen's jurisdiction in 1864, while Als is now part of the Diocese of Haderslev. Today, the Diocese of Funen consists of the islands of Funen, Langeland, and Ærø.

As of 2020, the diocese consists of 11 subordinate deaneries (Danish: Provstier): Assens, Bogense, Fåborg, Hjallese, Kerteminde, Langeland-Ærø, Middlefart, Nyborg, Odense Sankt Knuds, Midtfyn, and Svendborg. These deaneries are further divided into 234 parishes with a total of 251 individual churches.

List of Bishops 

Jørgen Sadolin,  1537–1559
Jacob Madsen Vejle, 1587–1606
Hans Knudsen Vejle, 1606–1616
Laurids Jacobsen Hindsholm, 1651–1663
Niels Hansen Bang, 1663–1676
Thomas Kingo, 1677–1703
Christian Rudolf Müller, 1704–1712
Christian Muus, 1712–1717
Vacant (1717–1732)
Jacob Ramus, 1763–1785
Tønne Bloch, 1786–1803
Peder Hansen, 1804–1810
Fredrik Plum, 1811–1834
Nicolai Faber, 1834–1848
Vacant (1848–1851)
Christian Thorning Engelsoft, 1851–1889
Vacant (1889–1900)
Hans Valdemar Sthyr, 1900–1903
Laurits Nicolai Balslev, 1903–1922
Vacant (1922–1958)
Hans Øllgard, 1958
Knud Christian Holm, 1958–1984
Vincent Lind, 1984–1995
Kresten Drejergaard, 1995–2012
Tine Lindhardt, 2012–present

References 

Church of Denmark dioceses
Diocese of Funen
1536 establishments in Denmark